Arthur Herrdin (26 November 1918 in Lillhärdal, Härjedalen – 20 July 1995) was a Swedish cross-country skier who competed in the 1940s and in the 1950s.

In 1948, he competed in the 50 km competition but did not finish the race.

Four years later he finished 13th in the 50 km event at the 1952 Winter Olympics in Oslo.

Cross-country skiing results

Olympic Games

External links
Olympic 50 km cross country skiing results: 1948-64

1918 births
1995 deaths
People from Härjedalen Municipality
Cross-country skiers from Jämtland County
Olympic cross-country skiers of Sweden
Cross-country skiers at the 1948 Winter Olympics
Cross-country skiers at the 1952 Winter Olympics
Swedish male cross-country skiers
20th-century Swedish people